The 2006–07 season of the Liga I Feminin was the 17th season of Romania's premier women's football league. Clujana won the title.

Standings

References

Rom
Fem
Romanian Superliga (women's football) seasons